Piers Morgan Uncensored is a television programme presented by Piers Morgan. It has been broadcast on TalkTV weeknights at 8 pm in the UK since 25 April 2022. It is also broadcast internationally on Sky News Australia in Australia and Fox Nation in the United States.

Show content is also available as an Acast podcast and as YouTube videos.

History
Morgan left Good Morning Britain in March 2021 following a controversy over his remarks about Oprah with Meghan and Harry, which included a heated on-air argument with Alex Beresford.

On 16 September 2021, News UK announced its new channel TalkTV would launch in 2022, with Morgan being the first name signed up. The show made its debut on 25 April 2022.

On 6 June 2022 TalkTV aired a two-hour special of the show to cover that day's Conservative Party vote of confidence in the leadership of Boris Johnson. Extended versions of the programme were also aired in July 2022 as the government crisis unfolded, leading to the resignation of Johnson.

The 25 July 2022 edition of the show began three days of editions covering Morgan's visit to Ukraine, where he was invited by First Lady of Ukraine Olena Zelenska to host her second Kyiv Summit of First Ladies and Gentlemen. Morgan also recorded an hour-long interview with President Volodymyr Zelensky and his wife First Lady Olena Zelenska, the first interview the couple have given to international television, and which was broadcast on 27 July.

In July 2022 it was announced that Jeremy Kyle would take over as a stand-in presenter from 1 August to 5 September while Piers Morgan was on holiday.

A three-hour special edition was aired on the evening of 8th September 2022, shortly after the announcement of the Death of Her Majesty Queen Elizabeth II, reflecting on the Queen's life following the breaking news. 

A two-hour special edition was aired on the evening following the state funeral of Queen Elizabeth II on 19 September 2022. Morgan recorded an interview with social media influencer Andrew Tate which aired in October 2022 following a controversy in which Tate had expressed "misogynistic" opinions. Later in October, a two-hour special in which Morgan interviewed the rapper Kanye West aired following remarks West had made that were deemed to be anti-Semitic.

On 21 October it was announced that Conservative MP Nadine Dorries would guest present two editions of Piers Morgan Uncensored on 24 and 25 October to coincide with the Conservative Party leadership election, and that she would be joined by Emily Sheffield, former editor of the London Evening Standard. Dorries' poor reception as a presenter prompted Steph McGovern to describe the show as "Piers Morgan Unwatched" while presenting the 28 October 2022 edition of BBC One's Have I Got News for You. Responding on Twitter the following day, Morgan posted a link to a Sun article that reported her own show, Steph's Packed Lunch had recorded zero viewers when it was launched in 2020 along with the comment: "Hear you were gobbing off about my @PiersUncensored ratings on #HIGFY last night @StephLunch – you sure you’re the best person to do that?".

In November 2022, the program aired an interview Morgan had recorded with Manchester United F.C. player Cristiano Ronaldo in which Ronaldo was critical of the club, felt that he was betrayed, had no respect for manager Erik ten Hag, and accused it of showing a lack of empathy when his young son died. Manchester United said it had "noted the media coverage". Following the interview, which aired in two parts on 16 and 17 November, United began seeking "appropriate steps", a legal action over whether Ronaldo had breached his contract. It was subsequently announced on 22 November that Ronaldo had left the club following the interview.

In January 2023, Morgan attracted criticism on social media following a conversation with Tina Brown in which the pair criticised Prince Harry's memoir, Spare, and after Morgan also threw a copy of the book in the bin while on air. Many viewers commented how they had had enough of the coverage, with one describing the piece as a "car crash". He faced further criticism after comments made on the 18 January edition of his show about Madonna ahead of her 40th anniversary world tour. Morgan criticised the singer for "the whole trying to be a sex kitten thing when you're in your sixties" and suggested she should be "put out to pasture". One viewer subsequently wrote on Twitter: "I think Piers should cover up his mouth, forget about whether older women should cover up their bodies."

In February 2023, Morgan recorded an interview with Rishi Sunak, the Prime Minister of the United Kingdom at 10 Downing Street in which Sunak said that he would publish his tax returns. The interview, which aired on 2 February, gave the show an average audience of 120,500, and putting TalkTV ahead of its main rivals on BBC News, Sky News and GB News during the 8.00–9.00pm timeslot.

Production
Piers Morgan Uncensored airs from a purpose-built studio within the Ealing Broadcast Centre in Ealing, West London, a for-hire facility built in 2021 by Timeline Television Ltd. On 5 December 2022, Press Gazette reported that TalkTV were planning to move production of Piers Morgan Uncensored to The News Building at London Bridge, along with Jeremy Kyle Live, which is also produced at Ealing.

Reception
Overnight viewing figures indicated that the first edition of Piers Morgan Uncensored was watched by 317,000 viewers. The next week's Monday edition fell further, with an average audience of 62,000. Morgan's YouTube channel's show episodes report around 10,000 views. The programme has experienced a decline in viewers since its opening week, with the 18 May edition reported to have attracted 10,000 viewers.

The 16 May 2022 edition of the programme attracted some media attention after an anonymous guest used the word cunt to describe Morgan during a debate about transgender women in sport.

On 8 August 2022, the Daily Telegraph reported that Piers Morgan Uncensored attracted an average audience of 33,900 on July 28.

Awards
Piers Morgan Uncensored won the 2022 Sports Journalists' Association (SJA) Scoop of the year award for the Ronaldo special episode, that aired on TalkTV.

References

External links
 
 Piers Morgan Uncensored at TalkTV

2022 British television series debuts
English-language television shows
News UK
2020s British television talk shows
Simulcasts